Trinity Seminary may refer to:
Holy Trinity Seminary, a Roman Catholic seminary in Texas.
Holy Trinity College and Seminary, a Southern Episcopal seminary in Florida.
Holy Trinity Orthodox Seminary, a Russian Orthodox seminary in New York.
Trinity Lutheran Seminary, a Lutheran seminary in Ohio.
Trinity Evangelical Divinity School, an Evangelical seminary in Illinois.
Trinity Episcopal School for Ministry, an Episcopal seminary in Pennsylvania.
Trinity Seminary, a Danish Lutheran seminary in Nebraska that merged with Wartburg Theological Seminary in Iowa.
Trinity College and Seminary, in Newburgh, Indiana

See also 

Trinity Theological College (disambiguation)
Trinity Theological Seminary (disambiguation)